Tachina casta is a species of fly in the genus Tachina of the family Tachinidae.

Distribution
This species can be found in such European countries as Bulgaria, Croatia, France, Greece, Italy, (including Sicily), North Macedonia, and Spain.

Description
Tachina casta can reach a body length of about .These flies are red or orange fire coloured, including antennae. Femurs, tibiae and tarsi are yellow-orange. The back of the abdomen has a black longitudinal median band ending in a point at tergite tergite 5. The lateral sector of the scutum and the post-pronotum are black. Post-pronotal (humerus), post-alar callus, lateral margins of the scutum, and pleural sclerites of the thorax are entirely or mostly orange-red.  They show  2 intra-alar postsutural setae, 4-8 marginal bristles on tergite 3 and 18-30 bristles on tergite 4.

Biology
Adults of Tachina casta feed on pollen. Their larvae are parasites of larvae of other insects, usually moths. They lay eggs on plants and the larvae move in the hope of finding a caterpillar and piercing its skin. If they succeed, they will feed on it and will pupate. Consequently they are good regulators of larvae of some species of moths, that seriously harm some plants.

External links
 Biodiversidad Virtual
 Galerie-insecte
 Diptera.info

References 

Insects described in 1859
Diptera of Europe
casta
Taxa named by Camillo Rondani
Taxobox binomials not recognized by IUCN